Darwin Gabriel Núñez Ribeiro (born 24 June 1999) is a Uruguayan professional footballer who plays as a forward for Premier League club Liverpool and the Uruguay national team.

Núñez came through Peñarol's youth academy, being promoted to the first team in 2017. In August 2019, he joined Spanish Segunda División club Almería for a club record fee. Benfica signed him in 2020 for a club-record transfer worth €24 million, the most expensive signing in Portuguese football history. In his second season, he won the Bola de Prata for top scorer in the Primeira Liga with 26 goals in 28 games, being named in the Primeira Liga Team of the Year and Primeira Liga Player of the Year. Liverpool then signed him in June 2022 for a transfer worth €75 million (£64 million).

After representing Uruguay at various youth levels, Núñez was called up to the full international team for the first time in October 2019. He scored on his international debut against Peru. After missing the 2021 Copa América due to an injury, Núñez represented Uruguay at the 2022 FIFA World Cup.

Early life
Núñez was born in Artigas, Artigas Department, into an impoverished family in which his father Bibiano Núñez was a builder and his mother Silvia Ribeiro was a hawker of milk bottles. He played for local clubs La Luz and San Miguel before being scouted at the age of 14 by former Uruguay international José Perdomo, and then moving by himself to the capital city Montevideo to join the ranks of Peñarol.

Struggling with homesickness, Núñez returned to his hometown to spend time with his family and went back to Peñarol a year later. At the age of 17, he suffered a cruciate ligament injury that ruled him out for over a year and required two operations. While he was injured, his older brother Junior quit the club and gave up football in order to provide for the family, telling him "you're better suited than me".

Club career

Peñarol
He made his first-team debut in the Primera División on 22 November 2017, when he came on for Peñarol as a second-half substitute for Maxi Rodríguez in a 2–1 away loss against River Plate Montevideo. The following month, he had knee surgery for a second time.

Núñez scored his first professional goal on 13 October 2018, with the opener in a 2–0 home win over Fénix. On 14 July 2019, he scored a hat-trick in a 4–0 victory against Boston River.

Almería
On 29 August 2019, Spanish Segunda División club Almería announced the signing of Núñez on a five-year contract, for a rumoured club record fee of US$4.5 million plus $1.5 million in variables. He made his debut on 3 October as a half-time substitute in 4–2 league defeat against Sporting Gijón.

On 27 October 2019, starting for the first time, Núñez scored first goal for his new club in a 3–2 home win against Extremadura with a penalty. He finished his only season at the Estadio de los Juegos Mediterráneos as the league's joint fourth top scorer with 16 goals, led by compatriot Cristhian Stuani.

Benfica

2020–21: Adaptation to Portugal
On 4 September 2020, Núñez signed a five-year contract with Portuguese club Benfica, who paid a club record fee of €24 million for the player. This was also Almeria's and the Segunda División's biggest transfer, with the club also receiving 20% of a future transfer. Eleven days later, he made his debut for the club in a 2–1 loss against PAOK for the 2020–21 UEFA Champions League third qualifying round replacing Pedrinho in the 65th minute of the game.

With his assist in a 3–0 win over Rio Ave on 18 October, he reached five assists in his first four league games, best in the league. On 22 October, he scored his first goals for the club with a hat-trick against Lech Poznań in a 4–2 away victory in a 2020–21 UEFA Europa League group stage match. Four days later, he scored his first Primeira Liga goal in a 2–0 home victory over B SAD.

On 3 December, after three weeks off through a COVID-19 infection, he returned to action against Lech Poznań in the Europa League group stage, scoring Benfica's second goal in a 4–0 home victory. He struggled over the course of the season with the effects of COVID-19 and various injuries, and did not score for four months. He scored six league goals and provided ten assists – second-best in the league – helping Benfica to a third-place finish and qualification for the Champions League third qualifying round.

2021–22: Breakthrough and Bola de Prata

In May 2021, Núñez underwent surgery due to an injury on his right knee, forcing him to miss Benfica's first months of the new season. He made his return from injury on 21 August, replacing Everton in the 72nd minute, in a 2–0 away victory over Gil Vicente, being booked in the process. Following back-to-back braces against Santa Clara and Boavista in the Primeira Liga, he was named the league's Player of the Month and Forward of the Month for September. On 29 September, he scored his first two Champions League goals in a 3–0 home victory over Barcelona, and was named man of the match.

On 27 November, he scored his first hat-trick in the league as his team finished the first half at B-SAD 7–0 up, though the game was abandoned early in the second half due to insufficient players on the COVID-affected host team. He added another treble on 12 December against Famalicão in a 4–1 away win, becoming the seventh player in the league to score back-to-back hat-tricks. Three days later, he scored two goals in a 3–0 home win over Sporting da Covilhã to send his team into the semi-finals of the 2021–22 Taça da Liga, though, while he was away on international duty for Uruguay, Benfica were defeated 2–1 by crosstown rivals Sporting CP in the 2022 Taça da Liga Final.

On 27 February, Núñez scored his 20th league goal for Benfica in as many matches, in a 3–0 home victory against Vitória de Guimarães. On 15 March, in the second leg of Champions League round-of-16, he scored the only goal of an away win over Ajax, securing a 3–2 aggregate win in the process. On 9 April, he scored his third hat-trick of the season in a 3–1 victory against B-SAD, bringing his total goal count for the season to 31 goals. He scored two goals against Liverpool in the 2021–22 Champions League quarter-finals: one in the first leg and the other in the second leg, while his team were eliminated 6–4 on aggregate. His sixth goal of the campaign made him Benfica's all-time top scorer in modern Champions League history, surpassing Nuno Gomes' record of five goals set in the 1998–99 season.

On 17 April, he scored a goal and provided an assist to help defeat the hosts Sporting 2–0 in the Derby de Lisboa, being named man of the match. In his last match for the club, on 7 May, Núñez scored a goal that was ruled out by VAR in a 1–0 home loss of O Clássico against rivals Porto, as they sealed the league title. He finished the season with 26 goals in 28 league games, being awarded the Bola de Prata award as top scorer of the Primeira Liga, being named in the Team of the Year and Player of the Year.

Liverpool

On 13 June 2022, Benfica reached an agreement with Premier League club Liverpool for the transfer of Núñez for a €75 million fee plus €25 million in add-ons. The following day, the club confirmed the deal, for £64 million, with add-ons potentially taking the overall fee to £85 million at a later date, making him Liverpool's record transfer.On 30 July, Núñez made his competitive debut for Liverpool in the club's 3–1 win over Manchester City in the FA Community Shield at the King Power Stadium. He won a penalty, which was converted by Mohamed Salah, and scored his first goal for the club with a stooping header in the fourth minute of stoppage time. On 6 August, he scored his first league goal for Liverpool on his debut against Fulham, which ended in a 2–2 draw. The following game, he was sent off for violent conduct in a 1–1 home draw against Crystal Palace, having headbutted opponent Joachim Andersen. On 12 October, Núñez scored his first Champions League goal for Liverpool in a 7–1 away win against Rangers. However, Núñez received criticism during the first half of the season for missing a number of big chances in matches. By his first 23 games for Liverpool, Núñez had scored 10 goals, one more than both Luis Suárez and Sadio Mané in the same number of games for the club.

On 18 February 2023, Núñez scored his first goal in the new year, opening Liverpool's 2–0 win home against Newcastle United, thus helping his club become the only team to defeat Newcastle twice during the season after a previous 2–1 victory at St. James' Park in August. On 21 February, Núñez scored Liverpool's first goal in a 5–2 home loss to Real Madrid with a flick between his legs in the first leg of Champions League round-of-16, followed by a brace against Liverpool's arch-rivals Manchester United on 5 March.

International career

Youth
Núñez is a former Uruguay youth international, and was part of under-20 team squad which finished third in 2019 South American U-20 Championship.

Núñez also took part in the 2019 FIFA U-20 World Cup, scoring in the opening match, a 3–1 over Norway. He scored the opening goal in a 2–0 over New Zealand in the final group match, to help Uruguay finish top of Group C. His country was eliminated from the tournament following a 3–1 loss to Ecuador in the round of 16.

Núñez was also in the under-22 team that finished in fourth place at 2019 Pan American Games in Peru, scoring in a 2–0 opening win over the hosts.

Senior

Núñez was called up to the Uruguay senior team for friendlies against Costa Rica and the United States in September 2019. He made his international debut on 16 October in a 1–1 draw away to Peru in a friendly match, replacing Brian Lozano in the 75th minute of the game and scoring five minutes later.

In June 2021, Núñez was included in the final 26-man Uruguay squad for the 2021 Copa América in Brazil. Due to a right knee injury that would rule him out for two months, he missed the tournament.

Núñez was selected in Uruguay's squad for the 2022 FIFA World Cup in Qatar. Uruguay were eliminated in the group stages of the tournament, after finishing below South Korea on goals scored.

Style of play
Núñez is known for his explosive speed and proficient technical football ability. In depth, Núñez is a right-footed player, he possesses an athletic frame, excellent acceleration and sprinting speed is the defining facet of his athletic skillset, with his explosive change of pace being capable of creating immediate separation. He also has good awareness, he scans space and makes decisions when moving relative to the ball, space, team-mates and opponents. Núñez is a disruptive striker with a dynamic range of mobility who can carry counter-attacks, make incisive movements around the box and strike the ball explosively. He is adept at attacking open spaces and is good at generating shots from varied situations. He is also a promising creator around the box and is also capable of playing as a left winger. Núñez usually opts to rely on intelligent positioning and timing of runs in between defenders, specially in attacking the space between a fullback and centre-back at the backpost, often initially curving his run away from the centre back before moving back infield. He often makes adjustments to his footwork to find space in the box and he also uses his body either to avoid a foul, but forcefully enough to arrive at a cross ahead of his marker.

During his spell at Benfica, under Jorge Jesus and Nélson Veríssimo, Núñez played in a variety of positions and systems. He played as a striker and a left inside-forward in a 4–4–2 and 3–4–3 formations, with the responsibilities in these roles, shifting on Benfica's ball possession or counter-attacking approaches for games. His ability to drift into the box and create space was a major part of his game, while also being aided by the presence of another striker (either Haris Seferovic or Gonçalo Ramos), which enabled Núñez to vacate his wide position to take up more positions in the penalty area. His playing style has led him to be compared to fellow Uruguyan forwards Edinson Cavani and Luis Suárez.

Personal life
Núñez and his partner Lorena Mañas announced the birth of their first child, a son, in January 2022. In addition to his native Spanish, Núñez also speaks Portuguese.

Career statistics

Club

International

Scores and results list Uruguay's goal tally first, score column indicates score after each Núñez goal

Honours
Peñarol
Uruguayan Primera División: 2017, 2018

Benfica
Taça de Portugal runner-up: 2020–21
Taça da Liga runner-up: 2021–22

Liverpool
FA Community Shield: 2022

Individual
Cosme Damião Awards – Footballer of the Year: 2021
Primeira Liga Forward of the Month: September 2021
Primeira Liga Player of the Month: September 2021
Primeira Liga Team of the Year: 2021–22
Primeira Liga Player of the Year: 2021–22
SJPF Player of the Month: April 2022
Primeira Liga Top Scorer: 2021–22
CNID Footballer of the Year: 2022

References

External links

Profile at the Liverpool F.C. website
Profile at the Uruguayan Football Association website (in Spanish)

1999 births
Living people
People from Artigas, Uruguay
Uruguayan footballers
Association football forwards
Peñarol players
UD Almería players
S.L. Benfica footballers
Liverpool F.C. players
Uruguayan Primera División players
Segunda División players
Primeira Liga players
Premier League players
Uruguay under-20 international footballers
Uruguay international footballers
Pan American Games competitors for Uruguay
2022 FIFA World Cup players
Uruguayan expatriate footballers
Expatriate footballers in England
Expatriate footballers in Portugal
Expatriate footballers in Spain
Uruguayan expatriate sportspeople in England
Uruguayan expatriate sportspeople in Portugal
Uruguayan expatriate sportspeople in Spain